Maik Schutzbach (born May 31, 1986 in Tuttlingen, Baden-Württemberg) is a German former professional footballer who played as a midfielder.

External links

1986 births
Living people
People from Tuttlingen
Sportspeople from Freiburg (region)
German footballers
Footballers from Baden-Württemberg
Association football midfielders
3. Liga players
SC Freiburg players
Kickers Offenbach players
1. FC Saarbrücken players